This article lists the structure of the Royal Danish Army in 1989 and in May 2020:

Royal Danish Army in 1989 
The army headquarters was located in Karup and tasked to train, maintain and prepare the army for war. However operational control in peacetime rested with the Western and the Eastern Regional Command. In wartime the former would have transferred its units to LANDJUT, while the latter would have become the LANDZEALAND command.

 Headquarters in Karup
 Jaegerkorpset, at Aalborg Air Base, (Long range reconnaissance and special operations)
 Army Material Command, Hjørring
 Army Depot Service
 Army Maintenance Service
 Army Ammunition Arsenal

Western Regional Command 

The Western Regional Command was based in Aarhus and commanded by a major general. In case of war it would have transferred command of all its units to NATO's Commander, Allied Land Forces Schleswig-Holstein and Jutland (LANDJUT). The command was responsible for the South Jutland, Ribe, Vejle, Ringkjøbing, Viborg, North Jutland and Aarhus counties, which together form the Danish part of the Jutland peninsula, and also for the island of Funen, which with the surrounding islands formed the Funen County.

 Western Regional Command, Aarhus
 Jutland Division, Fredericia
 3rd Signal Battalion
 1st Jutland Brigade, Fredericia
 1st Brigade Staff Company (5x M113, 8x TOW on Land Rover)
 1st Battalion, Jydske Dragonregiment, (20x Leopard 1A3, 21x M113 (including 4 with TOW), 4x M125 mortar carriers, 2x TOW on Land Rover)
 1st Battalion, Kongens Jyske fodregiment(10x Leopard 1A3, 32x M113 (including 4 with TOW), 4x M125, 4x TOW on Land Rover)
 1st Battalion, Fynske Livregiment, (10x Leopard 1A3, 32x M113 (including 4 with TOW), 4x M125, 4x TOW on Land Rover)
 6th Artillery Battalion, Nørrejyske Artilleriregiment, (12x M109A3 howitzer, 8x M114/39 155mm howitzer, 15x M113)
 1st Armoured Engineer Company (6 x M113)
 1st Logistic Battalion
 1st Military Police Detachment
 2nd Jutland Brigade, Skive
 2nd Brigade Staff Company (5x M113, 8x TOW on Land Rover)
 2nd Battalion, Jydske Dragonregiment, (20x Leopard 1A3, 21x M113 (including 4 with TOW), 2x M125)
 1st Battalion, Dronningens Livregiment, (10x Leopard 1A3, 32x M113 (including 4 with TOW), 4x M125, 4x TOW on Land Rover)
 2nd Battalion, Dronningens Livregiment, (10x Leopard 1A3, 32x M113 (including 4 with TOW), 4x M125, 4x TOW on Land Rover) 
 3rd Artillery Battalion, Nørrejyske Artilleriregiment, (12x M109A3 howitzer, 8x M114/39 155mm howitzer)
 2nd Armoured Engineer Company
 3rd Logistic Battalion
 2nd Military Police Detachment
 3rd Jutland Brigade, Haderslev
 3rd Brigade Staff Company (5x M113, 8x TOW on Land Rover)
 3rd Battalion, Jydske Dragonregiment, (20x Leopard 1A3, 21x M113 (including 4 with TOW), 2x M125)
 1st Battalion, Prinsens Livregiment, (10x Leopard 1A3, 32x M113 (including 4 with TOW), 4x M125, 4x TOW on Land Rover)
 2nd Battalion, Prinsens Livregiment, (10x Leopard 1A3, 32x M113 (including 4 with TOW), 4x M125, 4x TOW on Land Rover)
 7th Artillery Battalion, Sønderjyske Artilleriregiment, (12x M109A3 howitzer, 8x M114/39 howitzer)
 3rd Armoured Engineer Company
 7th Logistic Battalion
 3rd Military Police Detachment
 Divisional Artillery Regiment, Skive
 Staff and Target Acquisition Battery 
 23rd Artillery Battalion, (18x M114/39 155mm howitzer)
 24th Artillery Battalion, (18x M114/39 155mm howitzer)
 18th Heavy Battery, (4x M115 203mm howitzer)
 19th Heavy Battery, (4x M115 203mm howitzer)
 4th Battalion, Fynske Livregiment, (Motorized Infantry)
 5th Battalion, Jydske Dragonregiment, (Reconnaissance: 18x M41 DK-1, 9x M113, 9x M125)
 6th Battalion, Jydske Dragonregiment, (Tank destroyer Battalion: 50x Centurion Mk V (84mm gun))
 33rd Artillery Battalion, Skive, Nørrejyske Artilleriregiment (18x M59 155 mm gun, would have joined LANDJUT's Corps Artillery)
 14th Air Defence Battalion, (Stinger, Bofors 40 mm L/70)
 3rd Engineer Battalion
 8th Logistic Battalion
 Long Range Reconnaissance Company, Dronningens Livregiment
 Electronic Warfare Company
 Heavy Transport Company
 1st Military Police Company
 Jutland Battle Group, Holstebro
 7th Staff Company
 4th Btn, Jydske Dragonregiment, (Motorized Infantry) 
 3rd Btn, Kongens Jyske Fodregiment, (Motorized Infantry)
 4th Btn, Prinsens Livregiment, (Motorized Infantry)
 8th Artillery Btn, Nørrejyske Artilleriregiment, (6x M114/39 155 mm howitzer, 12x M101 105 mm howitzer)
 7th Engineer Company
 5th Logistic Battalion
 7th Military Police Detachment
 Territorial Command Jutland and Funen (VLK) in Fredericia
 5th Signal Battalion
 5th Engineer Battalion
 LRRP Company (SEP/VLK (Homeguard))
 Host and Support Battalion (Supporting arrival of NATO reinforcements in Jutland and northern Germany)
 Rear and Sustainment Battalion  
 Logistics Support Group West (LSG-W)
 Supply Battalion
 Transport Battalion 
 Medical Battalion (incl. Medical Train)
 Maintenance Battalion 
 Field Replacement Commando
 1st Territorial Region (Northern Jutland) in Aalborg
 3rd Btn, Dronningens Livregiment, (Infantry)
 15th Light Battery, Nørrejyske Artilleriregiment (8x M101 105mm howitzer)
 Engineer Company
 6x Homeguard Districts
 6x Homeguard Staff Companies
 31x Area Companies
 6x Homeguard Military Police Companies
 2nd Territorial Region (Middle Jutland) in Viborg
 3rd Btn, Prinsens Livregiment, (Infantry)
 9th Light Battery, Nørrejyske Artilleriregiment (8x M101 105mm howitzer) 
 Engineer Company
 10x Homeguard Districts
 10x Homeguard Staff Companies
 56x Area Companies
 10x Homeguard Military Police Companies
 3rd Territorial Region (Southern Jutland) in Haderslev
 2nd Btn, Kongens Jyske Fodregiment, (Infantry)
 3rd Btn, Slesvigske Fodregiment, (Infantry) 
 10th Artillery Battalion (Reserve), Varde, Sønderjyske Artilleriregiment  (16x M101 105mm howitzer)
 Engineer Company
 11x Homeguard Districts
 11x Homeguard Staff companies
 53x Area Companies
 11x Homeguard Military Police Companies
 4th Territorial Region (Funen) in Odense
 2nd Btn, Fynske Livregiment, (Motorized Infantry) incl Two Tank destroyer Squadron, (2x12 Centurion Mk V (84 mm gun))
 3rd Btn, Fynske Livregiment, (Infantry)
 11th Artillery Battalion (Reserve), Varde, Sønderjyske Artilleriregiment  (16x M101 105mm howitzer)
 Engineer Company
 5x Homeguard Districts
 5x Homeguard staff companies
 32x Area Companies
 5x Homeguard Military Police Companies

Eastern Regional Command 

The Eastern Regional Command was based in Ringsted and commanded by a major general, who in case of war would have become Commander, Allied Land Forces Zealand (LANDZEALAND). The command was responsible for the Copenhagen and Frederiksberg municipalities, and the Copenhagen, Frederiksborg, Roskilde, West Zealand and Storstrøm counties.

 Eastern Regional Command, Ringsted
 1st Signal Battalion
 1st Zealand Brigade
 4th Brigade Staff Company (5x M113, 8x TOW on Land Rover)
 1st Btn, Gardehusarregimentet, (30x Centurion (105mm L7 gun), 21 x M113 (including 4 with TOW), 2x M125)
 2nd Btn, Danske Livregiment, (10x Centurion (105mm L7 gun), 32x M113 (including 4 with TOW), 4x M125, 4 TOW on Land Rover)
 1st Btn, Den Kongelige Livgarde, (10x Centurion (105mm L7 gun), 32x M113 (including 4 with TOW), 4xM125, 4 TOW on Land Rover)
 1st Btn, Kongens Artilleriregiment, (12x M109A3, 8x M114/39)
 4th  Armoured Engineer Company
 2nd Logistic Battalion 
 4th Military Police Detachment 
 2nd Zealand Brigade
 5th Brigade Staff Company (5x M113, 8x TOW on Land Rover)
 2nd Btn, Sjællandske Livregiment, (30x Centurion (105mm L7 gun), 21 x M113 (including 4 with TOW), 2x M125), 
 1st Btn, Danske Livregiment, (10x Centurion (105mm L7 gun), 32x M113 (including 4 with TOW), 4xM125, 4 TOW on Land Rover)
 1st Btn, Sjællandske Livregiment, (10x Centurion (105mm L7 gun), 32x M113 (including 4 with TOW), 4xM125, 4x TOW on Land Rover)
 5th Btn, Kongens Artilleriregiment, (12x M109A3, 8x M114/39)
 5th Armoured Engineer Company
 4th Logistic Battalion 
 5th Military Police Detachment
 Corps Artillery
 Staff and Target Acquisition Battery 
 2nd Artillery Battalion, (18x M114/39 155 mm howitzer)
 32nd Artillery Battalion, (18x M59 155 mm gun)
 17th Heavy Battery, (4x M115 203mm howitzer)
 3rd Btn, Gardehusarregimentet, (Reconnaissance: 18x M41 DK-1, 12x M113, 9x M125)
 13th Air Defence Battalion, (Stinger)
 1st Engineer Battalion
 6th Logistic Battalion
 Electronic Warfare Company
 6th Military Police Company
 1st Zealand Battle Group
 1st Antitank Squadron Gardehusarregimentet, (8x Centurion (84 mm gun))
 2nd Btn, Den Kongelige Livgarde, (Light Infantry)
 3rd Btn, Den Kongelige Livgarde, (Light Infantry)
 16th Artillery Battalion, (24x M101)
 2nd Zealand Battle Group
 2nd Antitank Squadron, Gardehusarregimentet, (8x Centurion(84 mm gun))
 2nd Btn, Gardehusarregimentet, (Light Infantry)
 4th Btn, Gardehusarregimentet, (Light Infantry)
 22nd Artillery Battalion, (24x M101)
 3rd Zealand Battle Group
 3rd Antitank Squadron Gardehusarregimentet, (8x Centurion(84 mm gun))
 3rd Btn, Danske Livregiment, (Light Infantry)
 4th Btn, Danske Livregiment, (Light Infantry)
 21st Artillery Battalion, (24x M101)
 4th Zealand Battle Group
 4th Antitank Squadron, Gardehusarregimentet, (8x Centurion(84 mm gun))
 3rd Btn, Sjællandske Livregiment, (Light Infantry)
 4th Btn, Sjællandske Livregiment, (Light Infantry)
 14th Artillery Battalion, (24x M101)
Territorial Command Zealand(ELK)
 4th Signal battalion
 LRRP Company (SEP/ELK (Homeguard))
 Host and Support Battalion (Supporting arrival of NATO reinforcements on Zealand)
 Rear and Sustainment Battalion
 Logistics Support Group East (LSG-E)
 Supply Battalion
 Transport Company 
 Medical Battalion 
 Maintenance Battalion 
 Field Replacement Commando
 5th Territorial Region (Zealand) in Ringsted
 5th Btn Den Sjællandske Livregiment, (Infantry)
 5th Region Engineer Company
 9x Homeguard Districts
 9x Homeguard Staff Companies
 50x Area Companies
 9x Homeguard Military Police Companies
 6th Territorial Region (Northern Zealand/Copenhagen) in Copenhagen
 4th Btn Den Kongelige Livgarde, (Infantry, 6 compagnies) (Northern Zealand/Copenhagen)
 Guard Company (Vagtkompagniet), Den Kongelige Livgarde, (Infantry) (Copenhagen, city)
 Mounted Hussar Squadron, Gardehusarregimentet, (Infantry) (Copenhagen, city)
 6th Region Engineer Company
 4x Homeguard Districts (Northern Zealand)
 4x Homeguard Staff Companies
 15x Area Companies
 4x Homeguard Military Police Companies

Bornholms Værn 
In wartime the island of Bornholm was, due to the long distance from Zealand, an independent command. Furthermore, agreements signed after World War II forbade the stationing on Bornholm or reinforcing of Bornholm, by foreign troops. Therefore, the island was only guarded by one Battle Group with a single active light infantry battalion. However, during the transition to war this Battle Group would have been augmented and reinforced by local reservists.

 Bornholms Værn's Battle Group 
 Staff and Signal Company
 1st Battalion, Bornholms Værn (infantry) (4x TOW on Land Rover)
 2nd Battalion, Bornholms Værn (infantry) (reserve) (4x TOW on Land Rover)
 3rd Battalion, Bornholms Værn (infantry) (reserve) (12 x 106 mm RR on Jeep M38)
 Light Tank Squadron, "Bornholm Dragoons" (10x M41 DK-1)
 Light Reconnaissance Squadron (6x M41 DK-1)
 12th Artillery Battalion (18x M101)
 Air Defence Battery (Stinger)
 Motorized Engineer Company
 Maintenance & Logistic Company

Army Command, 2020 
The Army Command is one of seven staffs of the Danish military's Joint Defense Command in Karup and headed by the Chief of the Army. The command controls all units of the Royal Danish Army and consists of about 110 persons, 40 of which are part of the Army Command's Army Support Unit.

  Army Command (Hærkommandoen), in Karup
  Army Command's Army Support Unit (Hærkommandoens Hærstøtteenhed), in Karup

Multinational Division North 
The NATO-assigned Multinational Division North is a joined Danish, Estonian and Latvian higher headquarter based in Ādaži near Latvia's capital Riga. In case of a crisis in the Baltic Region the division would take command of NATO reinforcements deployed to the region.

  Multinational Division North, in Ādaži (Latvia)
  Division Staff, in Ādaži
 Forward HQ Element, in Ādaži
 Rear HQ Element, in Karup
  Command Support Battalion, Command Support Regiment, in Ādaži
  Multinational Staff, in Ādaži
  Command Support Company (Royal Danish Army), in Karup 
  Force Protection Company (Estonian Army)
  Real Life Support Company (Latvian Army), in Ādaži

1st Brigade 
The 1st Brigade ( - 1 BDE) is based in Holstebro and the army's reaction force. Assigned to NATO's Response Force the brigade is able to deploy on short notice for international peace-making and peace-keeping operations.

  1st Brigade (1. Brigade), in Holstebro
  1st Command Support Battalion, Command Support Regiment (1. Føringsstøttebataljon - 1 FOSTBTN), in Fredericia
  Brigade Staff Company
  Brigade CIS Company (Communications & Information Systems Company)
  I Armoured Infantry Battalion, Royal Life Guards (I/LG Panserinfanteribataljon), in Høvelte
  Staff Company
  1st Armoured Infantry Company, with CV9035DK infantry fighting vehicles
  2nd Mechanized Infantry Company, with Piranha V armored personnel carriers
  I Armoured Infantry Battalion, Guard Hussar Regiment (I/GHR Panserinfanteribataljon), in Slagelse
  Staff Company
  1st Armoured Infantry Company, with CV9035DK infantry fighting vehicles
  2nd Mechanized Infantry Company, with Piranha V armored personnel carrier
  II Armoured Infantry Battalion, Jutland Dragoon Regiment (II/JDR Panserinfanteribataljon), in Holstebro
  Staff Company
  1st Mechanized Infantry Company, with Piranha V armored personnel carrier
  4th Armoured Infantry Company, with CV9035DK infantry fighting vehicles
  1st Artillery Battalion, Danish Artillery Regiment (1. Artilleriafdeling - 1 AA), in Oksbøl
  Staff Platoon
  1st Fire Support Battery, with 6x Caesar 8x8 self-propelled howitzers, 4 x Cardom 10 120mm mortars mounted on Piranha V.
  2nd Fire Support Battery, with 6x Caesar 8x8 self-propelled howitzers, 4 x Cardom 10 120mm mortars mounted on Piranha V. 
  3rd Fire Support Battery, with 6x Caesar 8x8 self-propelled howitzers, 4 x Cardom 10 120mm mortars mounted on Piranha V.  
  1st Armoured Engineer Battalion, Engineer Regiment (1. Panseringeniørbataljon - 1 PNIGBTN), in Skive
  Staff Company
  1st Armoured Engineer Company, with 8x Piranha V , 2 x Biber/AVLB and 2 x AEV
  2nd Armoured Engineer Company with 8x Piranha V, 2 x Biber/AVLB and 2 x AEV
  3rd Armoured Engineer Company with 8x Piranha V, 2 x Biber/AVLB and 2 x AEV
  1st Intelligence, Surveillance and Reconnaissance Battalion (1. ISR-bataljon - 1 ISRBTN), in Varde
  Staff Platoon
  Analysis Cell
  Unmanned Aerial Vehicles Company, with 8x Piranha V
  Electronic Warfare Company, in Fredericia, with Piranha V 
  1st Logistic Battalion, Logistic Regiment (1. Logistikbataljon - 1 LOGBTN), in Aalborg
  Staff Platoon
  1st Supply Company
  2nd Medical Company
  3rd Maintenance Company
  4th Transport Company
  Military Police Company

2nd Brigade 
The 2nd Brigade ( - 2 BDE) is based in Slagelse and consists of five battalions. The brigade is responsible for the training and tactical development of the army's reconnaissance, tank and light infantry formations, and the training of the army's reserve personnel.

  2nd Brigade, in Slagelse
  I Armoured Battalion, Jutland Dragoon Regiment (I/JDR Panserbataljon), in Holstebro
  Staff Squadron (inactive)
  1st Tank Squadron, with 14x Leopard 2A7V main battle tanks
  2nd Tank Squadron, with 14x Leopard 2A7V main battle tanks
  3rd Tank Squadron (on low activity until the delivery of 14x Leopard 2A7V main battle tanks)
  III Reconnaissance Battalion, Guard Hussar Regiment (III/GHR Opklaringsbataljon), in Rønne
  Staff Platoon (Inactive)
  1st Light Reconnaissance Squadron (Allocated to 1st ISR battalion of 1 Brigade)
  2nd Light Reconnaissance Squadron
  3rd Light Reconnaissance Squadron (will activate in 2023)
  Marine Squadron (4th Basic Training Squadron)
  V Training Battalion, Guard Hussar Regiment (V/GHR Uddannelsesbataljon), in Slagelse
  1st Basic Training Company
  2nd Basic Training Company
  4th Mechanized Infantry Company, with Piranha III armoured fighting vehicles
  V Training Battalion, Jutland Dragoon Regiment (V/JDR Uddannelsesbataljon), in Holstebro
  1st Basic Training Squadron
  2nd Basic Training Squadron
  3rd Mechanized Infantry Company, with Piranha III armoured fighting vehicles
  XIII Light Infantry Battalion, Schleswig Regiment of Foot (XIII/SLFR Lette Infanteribataljon), in Haderslev
  Staff Company
  1st Light Infantry Company
  2nd Light Infantry Company
  3rd Light Infantry Company (will activate in 2023)
  4th Basic Training Company

Danish Artillery Regiment 
The Danish Artillery Regiment ( - DAR) provides the army with artillery units and manages the ammunition development. The regiment is also developing new air-defense capabilities for the army.

  Danish Artillery Regiment, in Oksbøl
  2nd Combat Capacity Battalion (2. Kapacitetsafdeling - 2 KAP)
  1st Basic Training Battery
  4th Air-defense Battery 
  5th Artillery Training Battery
  Combat and Simulation Section (KAMPSIM)
  3rd Safety and Ballistics Battalion (3. Sikkerheds- og Ballistikafdeling - 3 SIKBAL)
  Direct Fire Ammunition Section
  Indirect Fire Ammunition Section
  Shooting Range Inspectorate
  5th Reserve Battalion (5. Reserveafdeling)  (Training reservists for other units)
 Artillery Service Inspector Element
 Fire Support Coordination Element (Joint terminal attack controller)
 Garrison Support Unit

Engineer Regiment 
The Engineer Regiment ( - IGR) trains troops and provides units in the combat engineers, ordnance disposal, construction, geospatial and CBRN Defense specialities.

  Engineer Regiment, in Skive
  2nd Explosive Ordnance Disposal Battalion (2 EOD–bataljon - 2 EODBTN)
  5th Explosive Ordnance Disposal Company
  6th Basic Training Company
  7th Basic Training Company
  Engineer Training Company
  3rd CBRN & Construction Battalion (3. CBRN- & Konstruktionsbataljon - 3 CBRN & KONSTBTN)
  3rd Construction Company
  4th CBRN Defense & Geospatial Company
 Engineering Service Inspector Element
 Garrison Support Unit

Command Support Regiment 
The Command Support Regiment ( - FSR) provides headquarters and communication information system (CIS) capabilities to the Royal Danish Army, Royal Danish Air Force, Royal Danish Navy, Joint Arctic Command, Special Operations Command and NATO.

  Command Support Regiment, in Fredericia
  2nd Command Support Battalion (2. Føringsstøttebataljon - 2 FOSTBTN)
  1st DCM-E Company (Danish Deployable Communications & Information Systems Module, Echo Company)
  2nd CIS Company (Communications & Information Systems Company)
  3rd Basic Training Company
  3rd CIS Operations Support Battalion (3. CIS Operationsstøttebataljon - 3 CISOPSBTN)
  Implementation
  Frequency Section
  Joint Communication
  CIS Operations Centre
  Federated Mission Networking
  Training 
 Command Support Service Inspector Element
  Garrison Support Unit

Intelligence Regiment 
The Intelligence Regiment ( - EFR) based in Varde provides the army with military intelligence, and tactical and strategic reconnaissance capabilities.

  Intelligence Regiment, in Varde
  2nd Military Intelligence Battalion (2. Military Intelligence Bataljon - 2 MIBTN)
  Intelligence Fusion Cell
Collection, Coordination & Intelligence Requirements Management section (CCIRM)
All Source Analysis Cell (ASAC)
Exploitation section (TECHINT)
  Human Interactivity Company (HUMINT capabilities & CIMIC/PSYOPS capabilities) 
  Basic Training Company
 Military Intelligence Service Inspector Element
 Garrison Support Unit

Logistic Regiment 
The Logistic Regiment based in Aalborg is the military logistics regiment of the Royal Danish Army, providing supply, transport, and medical services.

  Logistic Regiment, in Aalborg
  2nd Logistical Battalion (2. Logistikbataljon - 2 LOGBTN)
  1st Basic Training Company
  2nd Basic Training Company
  3rd Logistic Training Company
  4th National Support Battalion, in Vordingborg (4. Nationale Støttebataljon - 4 NSBTN)
  1st National Support Element
  2nd National Support Element
  3rd National Support Element
  4th National Support Element
  5th National Support Element (Basic Training)
  Military Police (Militærpolitiet - MP)
  1st MP Company
  2nd MP Company
  MP School
  MP Guards
 Logistic Service Inspector Element
 Garrison Support Unit

Royal Life Guards 
The Royal Life Guards ( - LG) is a regiment based in Høvelte and consists of two battalions and one company. The regiment's I Battalion is operationally assigned to the 1st Brigade, while the II Battalion is a training unit. The regiment's Guard Company is based at the Rosenborg Barracks on Gothersgade street in central Copenhagen and guards the Danish royal family's residences.

  Royal Life Guards, in Høvelte
  II Training Battalion, Royal Life Guards (II/LG Uddannelsesbataljon), in Høvelte
  1st Mechanized Infantry Company, with Piranha III armoured fighting vehicles
  2nd Basic Training Company
  3rd Basic Training Company
  Guard Company (Vagtkompagniet), in Copenhagen
 Staff, 4x guard platoons, a supply platoon, and a drum corps
  Royal Life Guards Music Corps (Den Kongelige Livgarde Musikkorps - LMUK), in Copenhagen
 Garrison Support Unit

Guard Hussar Regiment 
The Guard Hussar Regiment ( - GHR) is based in Slagelse and consists of three battalions, which are operationally assigned to 1st Brigade respectively 2nd Brigade. The regiment's III Battalion is the army's only reconnaissance unit. The regiment's Mounted Squadron provides mounted escorts for the Danish royal family and for Royal Danish Army ceremonies.

  Guard Hussar Regiment, in Slagelse
  Horse Squadron (Hesteskadron - HESK)
 Garrison Support Unit

Jutland Dragoon Regiment 
The Jutland Dragoon Regiment ( - JDR) is based in Holstebro and consists of three battalions, which are operationally assigned to 1st Brigade respectively 2nd Brigade. The regiment's I Armoured Battalion is the army's only unit equipped with main battle tanks.

  Jutland Dragoon Regiment, in Holstebro
 Garrison Support Unit

Schleswig Regiment of Foot 
The Schleswig Regiment of Foot ( - SLFR) was reactivated on 1 January 2019 to manage the military base in Haderslev, home of the regiment's XIII Battalion, which is operationally assigned to the 2nd Brigade.

  Schleswig Regiment of Foot, in Haderslev
  XXII Battalion, Schleswig Regiment of Foot (XXII/SLFR) (Training reservists for other units)
  Schleswig Music Corps (Slesvigske Musikkorps - SMuK)
 Infantry Service Inspector Element
 Garrison Support Unit

Army structure graphic

Geographic distribution of units

References

External links
 Website of the Royal Danish Army

Royal Danish Army
Military of Denmark